Brenscombe Heath is a 34.7 hectare biological Site of Special Scientific Interest in Corfe Castle, Dorset, notified in 1985.

References

Sources

 English Nature citation sheet for the site (accessed 31 August 2006)

External links
 English Nature website (SSSI information)

Sites of Special Scientific Interest in Dorset
Sites of Special Scientific Interest notified in 1985
Corfe Castle